Hol Bygdamuseum is an open-air museum  located at the village of Hagafoss in Hol in Viken county, Norway.

Hol Bygdamuseum is a subsidiary of Hallingdal Museum, the regional folk museum for Buskerud. The museum is located in the traditional rural district of Hallingdal. The buildings at Hol Museum came from different parts of Hol municipality. The museum is designed as a farm dating from the 18th and 19th centuries. The museum consists of seventeen buildings, together with an exhibition featuring the distinct style of Rosemaling typical of Hallingdal.  The museum also features  local traditional dress.

References

External links
 Hol Bygdamuseum website, — in Norwegian
 Kulturnett.no, — in Norwegian

Hallingdal
Museums in Viken
Open-air museums in Norway